The Macon-Harrison House is a historic house at 209 NE Second Street in Bentonville, Arkansas.  Built in 1910, it is a large two-story brick structure with limestone trim, including corner quoining, porch columns and balustrades.  This high-quality late Victorian house was built by John Macon, who profited from the local apple industry by building an applejack distillery.  Macon reportedly built it as a wedding gift for his bride.

The house was listed on the National Register of Historic Places in 1988.

See also
National Register of Historic Places listings in Benton County, Arkansas

References

Houses on the National Register of Historic Places in Arkansas
Houses completed in 1910
Houses in Bentonville, Arkansas
National Register of Historic Places in Bentonville, Arkansas
1910 establishments in Arkansas
Victorian architecture in Arkansas